Hennock is a village and civil parish about 3 miles west north west of Chudleigh, in the Teignbridge district, in the county of Devon, England. In 2011 the parish had a population of 1747. The parish touches Bovey Tracey, Kingsteignton, Christow, Chudleigh and Trusham.

Features 
Hennock has a primary school. There are 47 listed buildings in Hennock.

History 
The name "Hennock" means 'At the high oak-tree'. Hennock was recorded in the Domesday Book as Hanoch/Hainoc. The parish was historically in the Teignbridge hundred. On the 25th of March 1885 an area of the parish was transferred to the parish of Bovey Tracey. The transferred area contained 8 houses in 1891.

References

External links 

Villages in Devon
Teignbridge